Lonnie Hillyer (March 25, 1940 in Monroe, Georgia – July 1, 1985 in New York City) was an American jazz trumpeter, strongly influenced by Dizzy Gillespie, Charlie Parker, Thelonious Monk
and other bebop legends of that era.

Lonnie Hillyer moved with his family to Detroit at age three, and began studying music at 14 under Barry Harris. In 1960, he moved to New York City, where he played with Charles Mingus, Yusef Lateef, and Clifford Jarvis. Lonnie Hillyer's association with Mingus lasted more than a decade, performing on records such as "My Favorite Quintet" and "Let My Children Hear Music".

In 1966, Lonnie Hillyer and Charles McPherson formed a quintet performed together during the years following. McPherson also grew up with Hillyer in Detroit. Around 1983 he and (former Monk tenor saxophonist) Charles Rouse formed a jazz quintet ("Bebop Quintessence"), with (drummer) Leroy Williams, (pianist) Hugh Lawson and (bassist) Ben Brown.

Hillyer performed live with many musicians including Thelonious Monk, Art Blakey, Philly Joe Jones, Willie Bobo, Barry Harris, Walter Davis, Jr., Abbey Lincoln, and many others.

He died of cancer in July 1985.

His son, Lonnie D. Hillyer, is a rock bassist (J. Walter Negro & The Loose Jointz, Maggie's Dream, Billy Joel, Gordon Gano, Bernie Worrell, Andrea Álvarez).

Discography

As sideman
With Eric Dolphy
Candid Dolphy (Candid, 1960) 
With Barry Harris
Newer Than New (Riverside, 1961)
With Yusef Lateef
Cry! - Tender (New Jazz, 1959)
With Charles McPherson
The Quintet/Live! (Prestige, 1966)
Charles McPherson (Mainstream, 1971)
With Charles Mingus
Reincarnation of a Lovebird (Candid, 1960) 
The Complete Town Hall Concert (Blue Note, 1962 [1994])
Mingus at Monterey (Jazz Workshop, 1964)
My Favorite Quintet (Jazz Workshop, 1965)
Music Written for Monterey 1965 (Jazz Workshop, 1965)
Let My Children Hear Music (Columbia, 1971)
Charles Mingus and Friends in Concert (Columbia, 1972)
With Pharoah Sanders
Oh Pharoah Speak - The Latin Jazz Quintet-Oh! (1965)

References

New York Times Obituary

1940 births
1985 deaths
American jazz trumpeters
American male trumpeters
Bebop trumpeters
Musicians from Georgia (U.S. state)
People from Monroe, Georgia
20th-century American musicians
20th-century trumpeters
20th-century American male musicians
American male jazz musicians